The 1960 USC Trojans baseball team represented the University of Southern California in the 1960 NCAA University Division baseball season. The Trojans played their home games at Bovard Field. The team was coached by Rod Dedeaux in his 19th season at USC.

The Trojans lost the College World Series, defeated by the Minnesota Golden Gophers in the championship game.

Roster

Schedule and results

Schedule Source:

Awards and honors 
William Ryan
All Tournament Team

Bob Levingston
All Tournament Team

Mickey McNamee
All Tournament Team

Art Ersepke
All Tournament Team
 1st Team All-CIBA

Bill Heath
All Tournament Team
ABCA 2nd team

Bruce Gardner
All Tournament Team
ABCA 1st team
 1st Team All-CIBA

Tom Satriano
ABCA 2nd team

Steve Bach
 1st Team All-CIBA

Mike Gillespie
 Honorable Mention All-CIBA

Ron Stillwell
 Honorable Mention All-CIBA

References

USC Trojans baseball seasons
USC Trojans baseball
College World Series seasons
USC